Sir Robert Hamilton, 1st Baronet (died 1703) was an Anglo-Irish official in Ireland. 

Hamilton was appointed Custos Rotulorum of County Armagh in 1681. On 19 February 1683 he was created a baronet, of Mount Hamilton in the Baronetage of Ireland, by Charles II of England. In 1685 he was appointed as a member of the Privy Council of Ireland by James II of England. 

He married Sarah Hamilton, the only child and heiress of Sir Hans Hamilton, 1st Baronet and Magdalene Trevor. Hamilton was succeeded in his title by his son, Hans Hamilton.

References

Year of birth unknown
1703 deaths
17th-century Anglo-Irish people
Baronets in the Baronetage of Ireland
Members of the Privy Council of Ireland
People from County Armagh